The Inspector General of Police (IGP) is the senior-most and highest ranked police officer of Bangladesh and the head of the Bangladesh Police, who oversees all police activities throughout the country. He reports directly to the Ministry of Home Affairs and is appointed by the Government of Bangladesh.

List of IGPs 
The Chief of Bangladesh Police is an Inspector General, which is the only three star rank of Bangladesh Police. IGP of Bangladesh Police enjoys Sr. Secretary status which is equivalent to Lt. General of Bangladesh Army. This is a list of Inspector Generals of Police since 1947, the inception of Bangladesh as East Pakistan.

 During Pakistan period

 After independence of Bangladesh

References